Klaus Grimmelt (born 11 April 1948) is a German former figure skater who represented West Germany. He is the 1970 Nebelhorn Trophy champion and a two-time (1970–71) national champion. He represented his country at three World and three European Championships, achieving his best placement, 13th, at Europeans in 1969 (Garmisch-Partenkirchen) and 1971 (Zurich). Grimmelt was a member of Düsseldorfer Eislaufgemeinschaft.

Competitive highlights

References 

1948 births
German male single skaters
Living people
People from Ratingen
Sportspeople from Düsseldorf (region)
Sportspeople from Düsseldorf